Grivița is a commune in Vaslui County, Western Moldavia, Romania. It is composed of three villages: Grivița, Odaia Bursucani and Trestiana.

References

Communes in Vaslui County
Localities in Western Moldavia